HD 36678 is single star in the northern constellation of Auriga. This star is dimly visible to the naked eye with an apparent visual magnitude of 5.83. It is located at a distance of approximately 840 light years from the Sun based on parallax. 

This is an aging red giant star with a stellar classification of M0III. It is currently on the asymptotic giant branch of the HR diagram, and has expanded to ~63 times the radius of the Sun. The star is radiating ~875 times the Sun's luminosity from its enlarged photosphere at an effective temperature of 3,950 K.

The brightness of HD 36678 is suspected of being variable.  Hipparcos photometry showed maximum and minimum apparent magnitudes of 5.806 and 5.855 respectively, in the Hipparcos photometric band.  No period was found, the variability has not been confirmed, and the star is not formally listed as a variable star.

References

External links
 HR 1866
 Image HD 36678

M-type giants
Suspected variables
Auriga (constellation)
Durchmusterung objects
036678
026344
1866